"The Metropolis and Mental Life" (German: "Die Großstädte und das Geistesleben") is a 1903 essay by the German sociologist, Georg Simmel.

Overview 
One of Simmel's most widely read works, "The Metropolis and Mental Life" was originally provided as one of a series of lectures on all aspects of city life by experts in various fields, ranging from science and religion to art. The series was conducted alongside the Dresden cities exhibition of 1903.

Simmel compared the psychology of the individual in rural life with the psychology of the city dweller. His investigation determines that the human psychology is altered by the metropolis. The individual must contend with such change in a metropolitan environment that the psychology of such an individual erects defences to protect itself from the stimuli of the metropolis. As such, the city dweller’s attitude and psychology is fundamentally different from an individual that inhabits rural life. The psychology of the city dweller, therefore, exhibits what Simmel describes as adaptations and adjustments which ultimately reflect the structures of the metropolis. Simmel characterises rural life as a combination of meaningful relationships, established over time. These kinds of relationships can not be established in the metropolis for a number of reasons (e.g. anonymity, number of vendors etc.), and as a result, the city dweller can only establish a relationship with currency – money and exchange becomes the medium within which the city dweller invests their trust.

Simmel seeks to explain human nature and how it plays a part in society.

See also 
 Antipositivism
 Symbolic interactionism
 Urban sociology

References

Further reading 

 

1903 essays
German essays
Sociology essays
Works about cities
Works about society